Allpaqani (Aymara allpaqa a kind of llama, -ni a suffix to indicate ownership, "the one with the alpaca (or alpacas)", hispanicized spelling Alpacani) is a mountain in the eastern extensions of the Cordillera Real in the Andes of Bolivia, about  high. It is situated in the La Paz Department, Sud Yungas Province, Irupana Municipality.

References 

Mountains of La Paz Department (Bolivia)